Dipsung is a village and Village Development Committee  in Khotang District in the Sagarmatha Zone of eastern Nepal. At the time of the 1991 Nepal census, it had a population of 950 living in 205 individual households.

People here are engaged mainly in agriculture and animal husbandry. It has a popular hydropower project: the Rawa Hydropower Project. It is composed of 9 wards. A only school, Shree Renuka Nimna Madhyamik Bidhyalaya gives education to almost 9 ward's Students, and is managed by the coordinator Mr. Manoj Timsina.

References

External links
UN map of the municipalities of Khotang District

Populated places in Khotang District